Catocala puella is a moth of the family Erebidae first described by John Henry Leech in 1889. It is found in northern China and Korea.

The wingspan is about 46 mm.

References

External links

puella
Moths of Asia
Moths described in 1889